The men's ISSF 50 meter pistol was a shooting sports event held as part of the Shooting at the 1964 Summer Olympics programme. It was the eleventh appearance of the event. The competition was held on 18 October 1964 at the shooting ranges in Tokyo. 52 shooters from 34 nations competed. Nations had been limited to two shooters each since the 1952 Games. The event was won by Väinö Markkanen of Finland, the nation's second victory in the event (only the second nation to have multiple wins, behind the United States at 4). American Franklin Green took silver, returning the United States to the podium in the event after a one-Games absence. Yoshihisa Yoshikawa of Japan repeated as bronze medalist, the fourth man to earn multiple medals in the free pistol.

Background

This was the 11th appearance of the ISSF 50 meter pistol event. The event was held at every Summer Olympics from 1896 to 1920 (except 1904, when no shooting events were held) and from 1936 to 2016; it was nominally open to women from 1968 to 1980, although very few women participated these years. A separate women's event would be introduced in 1984. 1896 and 1908 were the only Games in which the distance was not 50 metres; the former used 30 metres and the latter 50 yards.

Three of the top 10 shooters from the 1960 Games returned: bronze medalist Yoshihisa Yoshikawa of Japan, seventh-place finisher Vladimír Kudrna of Czechoslovakia, and tenth-place finisher Gavril Maghiar of Romania. The reigning (1962) world champion, Vladimir Stolipin, was not on the Soviet Olympic team, but runner-up Yoshikawa and third-place finisher Ludwig Hemauer of Switzerland did compete in Tokyo.

Iran, Jamaica, and Mongolia each made their debut in the event. The United States made its 10th appearance, most of any nation, having missed only the 1900 event.

Markkanen used a Hämmerli 101. Green also used a Hämmerli, but with an electric trigger he designed himself.

Competition format

The 1964 competition abandoned the two-round format introduced in 1960 and returned to a single round. Each shooter fired 60 shots, in 6 series of 10 shots each, at a distance of 50 metres. The target was round, 50 centimetres in diameter, with 10 scoring rings. Scoring for each shot was up to 10 points, in increments of 1 point. The maximum score possible was 600 points. Any pistol was permitted. Shoot-offs were held to break ties for top ranks.

Records

Prior to this competition, the existing world and Olympic records were as follows.

Väinö Markkanen matched the Olympic record.

Schedule

Results

References

Shooting at the 1964 Summer Olympics
Men's 1964